Fever/Dream is a play by Sheila Callaghan which premiered in 2009 at Woolly Mammoth Theatre Company in Washington, DC.  It is a reinvention of Pedro Calderón de la Barca's play Life is a Dream.

Plot summary
In Fever/Dream, Segis Basil, an employee at an American mega-corporation called Basil Enterprises, is literally chained to his desk in the basement, working in customer service hell.  He is the son of the powerful CEO of the company, Bill Basil.  However, Segis was unluckily born on Black Monday and his mother died in childbirth, leading his superstitious father to lock Segis away.  In the play, the elderly Basil contemplates the future of his corporation and decides to give his son the opportunity to run the company for a day.  When Segis takes business metaphors too far and sends the company's stock plummeting to ruin, he is returned to the basement and told it was all a dream. Meanwhile, Stella Strong and Aston Martin compete for the top offices and bike-messenger Rose and temp Claire scheme to take down the company.

Overview
The Washington Post said of the show: "Ace comic performances, sleek design and bracing direction. Enjoyably stylish [with an] antic pace and witty aesthetic."

Metro Weekly called it: "A pizzazz-filled concoction that skewers corporatism with a generous supply side of laughs.  [Callaghan] is without doubt the purveyor of top-shelf American wit. Director Howard Shalwitz, utterly simpatico with Callaghan's fast and furious twists and turns, delivers a superbly entertaining production, keeping his excellently cast ensemble primed and spinning like so many plates in the air."

References

2009 plays
American plays
Plays based on other plays
Comedy plays
Plays set in the United States
Adaptations of works by Pedro Calderón de la Barca